The Farmer's Joint Stock Bank was a bank that operated in Upper Canada, and later in the Province of Canada, from 1834 to 1854.

History
Following the 1821 legalization of small notes and bills of exchange in Upper Canada, the Bank was formed in 1834 as a private bank by George Truscott and John Cleveland Green in Toronto, Upper Canada. Francis Hincks, a journalist and colonial administrator, was invited to become its first cashier. In 1835, it was taken over by a group of Reformers and constituted as a joint-stock company called the Farmers' Joint Stock Banking Company by deed of settlement. The first board of directors appointed John Elmsley, a member of the Family Compact, to be its first president, which forced Hincks and other Reform investors to leave and found the Bank of the People in December 1835. When Upper Canada moved in 1837 to restrict the ability of institutions other than incorporated banks to issue their own banknotes, the Bank was exempted.

A financial crisis that affected Upper Canada in 1837 resulted in a suspension of the Bank's activities for two months at the end of that year. In 1838, it was barred from issuing banknotes that were not payable on demand.

Economic conditions, together with poor management and political intrigue, led to a move by the board to wind up the Bank in January 1844, which was not completed until December 1848 with its sale to new owners. William Brown Phipps, who had been Manager since 1841, returned to become Manager of the revived Bank in March 1849. In June 1849, it flooded Toronto and Buffalo with new issues of its banknotes, which were subsequently boycotted by merchants. It was finally closed in 1854.

Sources

Notes

References

Works cited

External links
 

Defunct banks of Canada
1834 establishments in Upper Canada
Banks established in 1834
Banks disestablished in 1854
1854 disestablishments in Canada
Canadian companies established in 1834